P is the sixteenth letter of the ISO basic Latin alphabet. 

P may also refer to:
 P, in Greek alphabet, the Rho, the lowercase p is also sometimes confused with Rho ρ or 
 P, in Cyrillic alphabet, the Er
  siglum for New Testament papyrus with Gregory-Aland number n
 In linguistics, P (also O), the patient-like argument (object) of a canonical transitive verb
 Encircled P, or ℗, is the sound recording copyright symbol
 p., an abbreviation for page when referencing a page number in a print publication
 Portugal country code in the vehicle registration plates of the European Union
 Parking, see also Parking (disambiguation).
 P (Nazi symbol), worn by Polish forced labourers during Nazi occupation
P, the aircraft registration prefix for North Korean planes
P, an abbreviation of gridiron football position punter

Arts, literature and music 
 P, code for the Paris Herbarium at the Muséum national d'histoire naturelle
 P, the ancient Greek author of the Hellenica Oxyrhynchia
 P, the production code for the 1965 Doctor Who serial The Crusade
 P (film), a 2005 Thai film
 "P" Is for Peril, a 2001 novel by Sue Grafton
 P, an abbreviation of Pinxit
 p or piano, a dynamic direction to play softly
 P, priestly source of the Hebrew Bible
 Agent P, the codename for Perry the Platypus in Phineas and Ferb

Music
 P (band), a 1993–95 American alternative rock band
 P (album), the 1995 eponymous release by American alternative rock band P
 "P," a song from the Venetian Snares album Cavalcade of Glee and Dadaist Happy Hardcore Pom Poms
 "P", a song by American rapper Jaden from his 2019 album ERYS

Computing 
 P(), the usual name for the operation to acquire a semaphore
 , the HTML element used to create a paragraph
 P-type semiconductor
 P (programming language), developed by Microsoft and UC, Berkeley
 Primitive programming language P′′
 p, a suffix unit for video resolution (vertical Progressive-scan lines), as in 720p or 1080p

Mathematics 
 p-value, in statistical hypothesis testing
 P (complexity), a complexity class in computational complexity theory
 #P complexity class
 P, universal parabolic constant
 Pi
 P or  - the set of all primes and p an individual prime
 ℘-functions or p-functions, are the Weierstrass elliptic function
 p-series, is a common name for the Harmonic series(mathematics)
 , [[Projective space]

Money, corporate 
 P (instead of ₱), a symbol often used for the Philippine peso
 p is a symbol for penny
 P, the New York Stock Exchange ticker symbol for Pandora Media, Inc., the corporate owner of Pandora Radio
 P, Panasonic's mobile phones in Japan
 Railpower Technologies (TSX: P), a Canadian company that builds environmentally friendly hybrid yard locomotives

Science 

 p, the symbol for momentum in physics
 P, the symbol for power (physics)
 P, the symbol for proposition
 Pulse, the rate of heartbeats
 Poise, the unit for dynamic viscosity in the centimetre gram second system of units
 Phosphorus, symbol P, a chemical element
 p, the symbol for pressure
 p, the SI prefix symbol for pico-, 10−12
 P, the SI prefix symbol for Peta-, 1012
 p, approximates the negative common logarithm (base 10) in pH, the measure of acidity or basicity
 Haplogroup P (mtDNA), a human mitochondrial DNA (mtDNA) haplogroup
 Haplogroup P (Y-DNA), a Y-chromosomal DNA (Y-DNA) haplogroup
 Methamphetamine, nicknamed "P" in New Zealand
 p designates the short arm of a chromosome
 ATC code P Antiparasitic products, insecticides and repellents, a section of the Anatomical Therapeutic Chemical Classification System
 Proline, an amino acid abbreviated P or Pro

Other uses
 Papa, the military time zone code for UTC−03:00

See also
 Pea (disambiguation)
 Pee (disambiguation)
 Rho (disambiguation)